New York's 129th State Assembly district is one of the 150 districts in the New York State Assembly. It has been represented by Democrat Bill Magnarelli since 1999.

Geography
District 129 is in Onondaga County. It contains portions of the city of Syracuse, as well as the surrounding towns of Geddes and Van Buren. Syracuse University is within this district.

Recent election results

2022

2020

2018

2016

2014

2012

References

129
Onondaga County, New York